Muhammad Khalil Akhtar (born 15 April 1984) is a Pakistani sports shooter. He competed in the men's 25 metre rapid fire pistol event at the 2020 Summer Olympics Tokyo, finishing 15th. He was also the flag-bearer at the  Opening Ceremony along with Mahoor Shahzad. After receiving an Olympic scholarship, he qualified at the 2019 International Shooting Sport Federation World Cup in Rio, where he finished sixth. In September 2019, Akhtar jumped to 15th position in the ISSF world rankings.

Career 

Akhtar won silver in the 2016 South Asian Games. Khalil Akhtar finished sixth in the men's 25 metre rapid fire pistol event at the 2018 Commonwealth Games.

25 metre rapid fire pistol

References 

1984 births
Living people
Pakistani male sport shooters
Olympic shooters of Pakistan
Shooters at the 2020 Summer Olympics
Shooters at the 2018 Asian Games
Asian Games competitors for Pakistan
Shooters at the 2018 Commonwealth Games
Commonwealth Games competitors for Pakistan